In optics and especially telescope making, sagitta or sag is a measure of the glass removed to yield an optical curve. It is approximated by the formula

 ,

where  is the radius of curvature of the optical surface. The sag  is the displacement along the optic axis of the surface from the vertex, at distance  from the axis.

A good explanation both of this approximate formula and the exact formula can be found here.

Aspheric surfaces
Optical surfaces with non-spherical profiles, such as the surfaces of aspheric lenses, are typically designed such that their sag is described by the equation

Here,  is the conic constant as measured at the vertex (where ).

See also
 Versine
 Chord

References

Optics